No Time No Space No Age No Race That's Nifty! is the debut studio album of Swedish model and actress Ulla Jones.

Production and arrangement 

That's Nifty was released under Swedish record label "Four Leaf Records". It was produced by Swedish musician and fellow Four Leaf Clover artist Lasse Samuelson and Swedish flautist, keyboardist and composer Björn J:son Lindh, who also released albums under Four Leaf Clover Records. That's Nifty was recorded and released in 1979. The album was recorded at Studio Decibel in Sweden with Goran Staaf serving as a technician and had Bengt Göran Staaf serving as Engineer.

The album artwork was shot by Little Magnus & Big Appel and Johann Rönn. The cover of the album features Ulla Jones wearing a black and white striped shirt and a light blue tie with short dirty blonde hair.

Writing 
Ulla Jones performed and wrote eleven of the twelve songs, except "Long Legged Thilly", which was sung by Swedish singer Turid Lundqvist and written by Jo-Ellen Lapidus who wrote it about Ulla.

Track listing

Release 
The album was originally released as a vinyl LP in 1979. It was later made available for digital download throughout digital outlets including iTunes, Spotify, and Amazon MP3.

References 

1979 debut albums
Ulla Jones albums
Albums produced by Lasse Samuelson
Albums produced by Björn J:son Lindh